The 1965 Grand Prix motorcycle racing season was the 17th F.I.M. Road Racing World Championship Grand Prix season. The season consisted of thirteen Grand Prix races in six classes: 500cc, 350cc, 250cc, 125cc, 50cc and Sidecars 500cc. It began on 21 March, with United States Grand Prix and ended with Japanese Grand Prix on October, 24.

Season summary
Mike Hailwood easily claimed his fourth successive 500 class crown for MV Agusta, although he was beginning to show his disenchantment with the autocratic Count Agusta by accepting a 250 class ride from Honda. Newcomer Giacomo Agostini riding for MV Agusta would battle Honda's reigning champion Jim Redman for the 350 title. The outcome wouldn't be decided until the final race of the year in Japan, when Agostini's MV Agusta suffered a mechanical failure, handing the championship to Redman.

The Yamaha duo of Phil Read and Michelle Duff finished first and second in the 250 class, as Honda's Redman battled early season injuries. Hugh Anderson won six races to claim his second 125 championship for Suzuki while Honda's Ralph Bryans took the 50cc crown ahead of his Honda teammate Luigi Taveri.

1965 Grand Prix season calendar

Standings

Scoring system
Points were awarded to the top six finishers in each race.  Only the best of six races were counted in 50cc, 350cc and 500cc championships, best of seven in 125cc and 250cc championships, while in the Sidecars, only the best of four races were counted.

500cc final standings

350cc Standings

250cc Standings

125cc Standings

50cc Standings

References

Notes
 Büla, Maurice & Schertenleib, Jean-Claude (2001). Continental Circus 1949-2000. Chronosports S.A. 

Grand Prix motorcycle racing seasons
Grand Prix motorcycle racing season